The 2022–23 Big 12 Conference women's basketball season began non-conference play on November 7, 2022. The conference schedule began on December 31, 2022. This will be the twenty-seventh season under the Big 12 Conference name.

The Big 12 Conference tournament is scheduled for March 9–10, 2023 at the Municipal Auditorium in Kansas City, Missouri.

Pre-season

Preseason watchlists
Below is a table of notable preseason watch lists.

Preseason polls

Big 12 Conference Coaches' Poll

Source:

Big 12 Conference Preseason All-Conference

Preseason All-Big 12 Team

 Unanimous selections are shown in Bold
 A tie for the 10th spot resulted in 11 selections

Honorable Mentions

Ja’Mee Asberry (Baylor), Dre’Una Edwards (Baylor), Zakiyah Franklin (Kansas), Taiyanna Jackson (Kansas), Ana Llanusa (Oklahoma), Shaylee Gonzales (Texas), Taylor Jones (Texas), Sonya Morris (Texas), JJ Quinerly (West Virginia), Madisen Smith (West Virginia)

Preseason Player of the Year

 Ashley Joens - Iowa State

Preseason Newcomer of the Year

 Aijha Blackwell - Baylor

Preseason Freshman of the Year

 Darianna Littlepage-Buggs - Baylor

Source:

Midseason watchlists
Below is a table of notable midseason watch lists.

Final watchlists
Below is a table of notable year end watch lists.

Regular season

Records against other conferences

Record against ranked non-conference opponents
This is a list of games against ranked opponents only (rankings from the AP Poll):

Team rankings are reflective of AP poll when the game was played, not current or final ranking

† denotes game was played on neutral site

Rankings

Awards and honors

Players of the Week 
Throughout the conference regular season, Big 12 Conference offices named two players (Player and Freshman) of the week each Monday.

Post season

Big 12 Conference tournament

*denotes overtime

NCAA tournament

Six team from the conference were selected to participate.

WNIT

Three teams from the conference were selected to participate: Kansas, Kansas State & Texas Tech.

References